Veronica Bennett is a children's novelist. She previously worked part-time as an English Lecturer and now writes fiction full-time. She graduated from University College, Cardiff in 1975 with an Honors degree in English.  She began her writing career as a freelance journalist, but soon moved into fiction. Her first book, Monkey, was published in 1998 and was acclaimed by The Times Educational Supplement as "an impressively well-written and audacious debut". Veronica Bennett is married with two children, and currently resides in Middlesex.

Bibliography
Monkey (1998)
The Boy-free Zone (1999)
Dandelion and Bobcat (2000)
Fish Feet (2002)
Angelmonster (2005)
Cassandra's Sister (2006)
Shakespeare's Apprentice (2007)

References

English women novelists
English children's writers
1953 births
Living people
21st-century English novelists
21st-century English women writers